Phyllometra is a genus of moths in the family Geometridae erected by Jean Baptiste Boisduval in 1840.

Species
Phyllometra culminaria (Eversmann, 1843)
Phyllometra teneraria (Staudinger, 1892)

References

Boarmiini